Joseph Peter Graw (August 8, 1915 – August 29, 2018) was an American businessman and politician who served in the Minnesota House of Representatives from 1963 to 1974. Graw also worked in the real estate and insurance business.

Early life and education 
Graw was born in Knoxville, Iowa. He graduated from Messmer High School in Milwaukee, Wisconsin. He attended Chicago Technical College and Northwestern University. Graw served in the United States Army during World War II and was commissioned a captain.

Personal life 
Graw has three children. He died in Bloomington, Minnesota on August 29, 2018 at the age of 103.

References

1915 births
2018 deaths
People from Bloomington, Minnesota
People from Knoxville, Iowa
Military personnel from Iowa
Northwestern University alumni
Businesspeople from Minnesota
Members of the Minnesota House of Representatives
American centenarians
Men centenarians
20th-century American businesspeople